SJM is an abbreviation of:
Swadeshi Jagaran Manch
Svalbard and Jan Mayen
Servi Jesu et Mariae
Samyukta Janamorcha Nepal
Super Junior-M

in business:
The NYSE symbol for The J.M. Smucker Co.
Sociedade de Jogos de Macau, casino subsidiary of Sociedade de Turismo e Diversões de Macau